Diamond Duggal also known as DJ Swami is a British-Indian music producer, composer, sound designer and multi-instrumentalist. He has produced a diversity of award-winning global artists, including Shania Twain, Pras Michel, Apache Indian, Maxi Priest, Stereo Nation, Zoheb Hassan and Viktor Kiraly as well as remixing artists including Erasure, The Beat and Nusrat Fateh Ali Khan. He has also performed and toured as lead guitarist with Boyzone and Robbie Williams. Diamond is also co-founder of production duo Simon and Diamond with his brother Simon Duggal. As DJ Swami, he performs and records electronic, Indian Punjabi Bhangra and South Asian music both as a solo artist and as band leader of UK electronic world music acts Swami and PunjabTronix. DJ Swami also tours and performs in collaboration with Deep Forest.

Diamond received an Ivor Novello Awards songwriter nomination for the song Arranged Marriage and his songwriting and production contributed to the Mercury Prize nomination for the album No Reservations by Apache Indian. Diamond also produced and played alongside mentor Mutt Lange on the Shania Twain double Grammy Award-nominated album Up!

As DJ Swami, he has won Best Producer 2005 and Best Producer 2008  at the UK Asian Music Awards. He also won the award for Best Mixed Album at the South African Music Awards 2010.

His most successful solo Swami album to date was 2004's DesiRock, the title track from which has been used in a variety of films, TV shows and video games.

Biography
Born Diamond Jyoti Duggal, he grew up in the Handsworth district of Birmingham, England in a melting pot of second-generation Indian and Jamaican multi-culturalism. By the age of 12, he was already playing guitar in local reggae and rock bands. While learning the craft of music through listening to records by Jimi Hendrix, Ravi Shankar, Kraftwerk, Laxmikant Pyarelal and local Birmingham artists Steel Pulse and UB40, Diamond witnessed his first glance of a new musical hybrid and what was ultimately to become his life's passion.

In 1991, as production duo Simon and Diamond, the brothers launched the groundbreaking production fusion sound of dancehall reggae and bhangra with the artist Apache Indian. The project received huge public and media interest due to its cultural diversity and was making huge waves in the UK, USA, Canada and India. This marked a new milestone in British Asian popular music, soon followed by a record deal with Island Records and a publishing deal with Sony Music in 1992. The Apache Indian debut album 'No Reservations' became a huge international success.

In 1997, Diamond started the group Swami with drummer and brother Simon, vocalist Taz Singh and Indian percussionist Kam Bura. The band performed a number of local and European shows before releasing their debut album Desi Nu Skool Beatz on their SubDub Records label in 1999. The album was given an international release in 2000 on Nation Records (Beggars Banquet). The guitar surfing electronic title track "Mehbooba" went on to feature in the Olsen Twins Warner Brothers movie New York Minute (2003).

Diamond took to the studio in 2002 to work with Shania Twain on her follow-up album to Come On Over entitled Up!. The album was produced by a totally international team co-ordinated between producer Mutt Lange, Simon and Diamond. Shania Twain's Up! topped the American Billboard for six weeks in late 2002 with multi-platinum sales exceeding 15 million and received two Grammy nominations in 2004.

Swami's follow-up album was So Who Am I on SonyBMG in 2005. The title track "DesiRock" embraced clubs the world over with DJ Swami's unique left field electronic beats and anthemic bhangra melodies and reached even wider audiences in the EA Games FIFA World Cup 2006 video game as well as the UK movie Mischief Night (2006).

In 2005, Diamond won "Best Producer" at the UK Asian Music Awards.

In June 2007, Diamond (as DJ Swami) was listed in the official Guardian Glastonbury Festival Guide as one of the Top 5 acts to see at Glastonbury 2007 alongside Amy Winehouse and the Arctic Monkeys. The performance was highlighted by the BBC Asian Network. 

In January 2008, Swami's album Equalize was voted album of the year by DesiHits.com. The album features mainstream collaborations from the US, South Africa, France, England and India.

In March 2008, as DJ Swami, he won "Best Producer" at the UK Asian Music Awards for a second time.

In August 2008, Swami's "Hey Hey" music video received its Canadian premiere at Toronto's FILMI South Asian Film Festival.

In April 2010, Diamond won SAMA Best Mix Engineer at the South Africa Music Awards.
In 2013, Diamond produced the single 'Fire' for artist Viktor Kiraly reaching the number 1 chart position in Hungary's MAHASZ Top 40.

In 2014, Diamond produced the second single 'Running Out Of Time' for Viktor Kiraly featuring Run DMC reaching the number 1 chart position in Hungary's VIVA chart.

In 2015, Diamond completed production for Zoheb Hassan album Signature featuring the legendary vocals of his sister Nazia Hassan.

In 2017, DJ Swami produced and toured the UK with new electronic meets Punjabi folk project PunjabTronix, as part of the ReImagine India cultural exchange programme.

In 2019, DJ Swami and Casey Rain commenced a weekly brand new radio show entitled 'The Phaseshift' on Dash Radio and Rukus Avenue Radio.

Other notable work

As a writer, Diamond notably reviewed Sarfraz Manzoor's Greetings From Bury Park for The Guardian. The book was later adapted into the film Blinded by the Light.

Production discography

1990
 Doggy – "Psyche" (single/ Rham Records)
 Demonik – "Labyrinthe" (single/ Rham Records)

1991
 The Badman – "Magic Style/Shape Dancing" (single and remix/ CityBeat)
 The Badman Presents N.D.X. – "Come With Me/Higher than Heaven" (single and remix/ CityBeat)
 Aretha Daye – "No More (Making Love)" (single)

1992/1993
 Apache Indian – No Reservations (album/ Island Records)
 Apache Indian – "Arranged Marriage" (single and remix/ Island Records)
 Apache Indian – "Chok There" (single and remix/ Island Records)
 Louie Rankin – "Typewriter" (remix/ Ruffness)
 Johnny Zee – "Cum Be My Lover" (remix)
 Dillinger – "Cokane in My Brain" (remix/ Island Records)

1994/1995
 Erasure – "Run to the Sun" (remix/ Mute)
 The Beat – "Mirror in the Bathroom" (remix/ London Records)
 Raise – "I Got It" (single and remix/ SubDub)

1997/1998
 Stereo Nation – "I’ve Been Waiting" (single)
 Stereo Nation – Jambo (album)

1999
 Swami – Desi Nu Skool Beatz (album/ Nation Records)
 Swami – Turntablism (album/ Envy Entertainment Ltd)
 Swami – "Transmission" (single)
 Taz – Nasha (album/ SubDub)
 DJ Swami - Sub Culture Vol. 1 (album/ SubDub)

2000/2001
 Nusrat Fateh Ali Khan – Redefined (remix album/ OSA)
 DJ Swami - Pure Garage Volume 2 (album/ Roma II)
 DJ Swami - Sub Culture Vol. 2 (album/ Roma II)

2002
 Shania Twain – Up! (album/ Mercury)
 Swami – BhangraDotCom (album/ Nation Records)
 DJ Swami - Pure Garage Volume 4 (album/ Roma II)

2004
 Pras – "Light My Fire" (remix)
 Swami – DesiRock (album)

2005
 Swami – So Who Am I (album/ Sony BMG)
 Apache Indian – Time for Change (album/ Revolver)

2007
 Swami – Equalize (album/ EMI Virgin)

2008
 Tigerstyle – "Balle Shava" (remix)
 Delhi 2 Dublin – "Dil Nachde" (remix)

2009
 Swami – Electro Jugni/She’s Mine EP
 Swami – 53431 (album/ EMI Virgin)
 Swami – "Sugarless" (single and remix)
 Ishmael – On the Edge (album/ Ghetto Ruff)
 Meja – "Regrets" (remix/ Sony)

2010
 Meja – "Chasing Butterflies" (remix/ Sony)
 Delhi 2 Dublin – Planet Electric (album mixing)

2011
 Swami – Upgrade (album recording)
 Deep Forest – "Deep Swami" recording/ remixes

2012
 Fell On Deaf Ears – Are You Getting Enough?  (album mixing)
 Swami – Upgrade (album mixing)

2013
 Swami – "Back It Up" (single)
 Viktor Kiraly – "Fire" (single)
 Pop Chaot – album tracks

2014
 Swami – "Do It Again" (single)
 Viktor Kiraly – "Running Out of Time" (single)
 Viktor Kiraly – "Work" (album track)
 Zoheb Hassan – "Signature" (album)

2015
 Swami – "We Are" (single)
 Viktor Kiraly – "Exhale" (single)
 Zoheb Hassan – "Always on My Mind" (single)
 Meja – "Yellow Ribbon" (remix)

2016
 Unnati - "Teri Yaad Aati Hain" (Buddha Bar Ultimate Experience)

2017
 Swami – "UPGRADE" (album)
 Swami – "SIDETRKD" (album)

2018
 PunjabTronix – "PunjabTronix" (EP/ Asian Arts Agency)

2019
 DJ Swami – "Hybrids" (EP/ DesiRock Ent.)
 DJ Swami – "Hybrids 2" (EP/ DesiRock Ent.)
 DJ Swami – "8020" (EP/ DesiRock Ent.)
 DJ Swami – "PunjabTronix Remixes" (EP/ DesiRock Ent.)

References

External links 
Diamond Duggal website
DJ Swami website
Simon and Diamond website
Swami performing at BBC Asian Network Uni Tour 07
An interview and another with DJ Swami
Another interview and the German translation with Diamond

English record producers
English DJs
Punjabi people
Living people
English people of Indian descent
Year of birth missing (living people)
English Sikhs
Musicians from Birmingham, West Midlands
People from Handsworth, West Midlands